Pseudosimnia carnea, common name the dwarf red egg shell, is a species of sea snail, a marine gastropod mollusk in the family Ovulidae, the ovulids, cowry allies or false cowries.

The subspecies Pseudosimnia carnea expallescens Schilder, 1967is a taxon inquirendum.

Description
The size of the shell varies between 8 mm and 19 mm.

Distribution
This * Occurs in the Mediterranean Sea, off Northwest Africa (Senegal); off the West Indies.

References

 Coen G. (1933). Saggio di una Sylloge Molluscorum Adriaticorum. Memorie del Regio Comitato Talassografico Italiano 192: pp. i-vii, 1-186
 Coen, G. (1949). Nota su alcune forme nuove di Cypreacea. Historia Naturalis. 3(1): 13-18
 Lorenz F. & Fehse D. (2009) The living Ovulidae. A manual of the families of allied cowries: Ovulidae, Pediculariidae and Eocypraeidae. Hackenheim: Conchbooks

External links
 
 Poiret, J. L. M. (1789). Voyage en Barbarie, ou Lettres écrites de l'ancienne Numidie pendant les années 1785 & 1786, sur la religion, les coutumes & les murs des Maures & des Arabes-Bédouins; avec un essai sur l'histoire naturelle de ce pays. Par M. l'abbé Poiret. Paris.
 Dillwyn, L. W. (1817). A descriptive catalogue of Recent shells, arranged according to the Linnean method; with particular attention to the synonymy. London: John and Arthur Arch. Vol. 1: 1-580; Vol. 2: 581-1092 + index
 Bucquoy E., Dautzenberg P. & Dollfus G. (1882-1886). Les mollusques marins du Roussillon. Tome Ier. Gastropodes. Paris: Baillière & fils. 570 pp., 66 pls.
  Schumacher, C. F. (1817). Essai d'un nouveau système des habitations des vers testacés. Schultz, Copenghagen. iv + 288 pp., 22 pls
 Fischer von Waldheim, G. (1807). Museum Demidoff, ou, Catalogue systématique et raisonné des curiosités de la nature et de l'art: données à l'Université Impériale de Moscou par son excellence Monsieur Paul de Demidoff. Tome III. Végétaux et Animaux. Moscow: Imprimerie de Université Impériale de Moscou. 300 pp, 6 pls. 
 Mawe, J. 1823. The Linnaean system of conchology, describing the orders, genera and species of shells, arranged into divisions and families. London: J. Mawe. 207 pp., 37 pls
 Pallary, P. (1900). Coquilles marines du littoral du département d'Oran. Journal de Conchyliologie. 48(3): 211-422
 Gofas, S.; Le Renard, J.; Bouchet, P. (2001). Mollusca. in: Costello, M.J. et al. (eds), European Register of Marine Species: a check-list of the marine species in Europe and a bibliography of guides to their identification. Patrimoines Naturels. 50: 180-213
 Cate C.N. (1973). A systematic revision of the recent cypraeid family Ovulidae. The Veliger. 15 (supplement): 1-117.

Ovulidae
Gastropods described in 1789